Giovanni Carboni (born 31 August 1995 in Fano) is an Italian cyclist, who currently rides for UCI ProTeam . In May 2019, he was named in the startlist for the 2019 Giro d'Italia.

Major results

2013
 2nd Time trial, National Junior Road Championships
2015
 1st  Young rider classification Sibiu Cycling Tour
 2nd Time trial, National Under–23 Road Championships
 10th Time trial, UEC European Under–23 Road Championships
2016
 2nd Time trial, National Under–23 Road Championships
 5th GP Capodarco
 6th Overall Tour d'Azerbaïdjan
 6th Overall Ronde de l'Isard
 7th Overall Course de la Paix U23
2017
 5th Overall Giro della Valle d'Aosta
1st Stage 1
 7th Giro del Medio Brenta
 9th Trofeo Piva
2018
 7th Overall Adriatica Ionica Race
 8th Overall Tour of Austria
2019
 6th Overall Route d'Occitanie
 6th Gran Premio di Lugano
 Giro d'Italia
Held  after Stages 6–8
2021
 4th Overall Adriatica Ionica Race
 8th Overall Tour of Slovenia
2022
 1st Stage 3 Adriatica Ionica Race

Grand Tour general classification results timeline

References

External links

1995 births
Living people
Italian male cyclists
People from Fano
Sportspeople from the Province of Pesaro and Urbino
Cyclists from Marche